Northern Pakistan is a tourism region in the northern and northwestern parts of Pakistan, comprising the administrative units of Gilgit-Baltistan (formerly known as Northern Areas), Azad Kashmir, Khyber Pakhtunkhwa, and the Pothohar Plateau in Punjab. The first two territories are a part of the wider Kashmir region. Usually, the federal territory of Islamabad is also considered to be in northern Pakistan. It is a mountainous region straddling the Himalayas, Karakoram and the Hindu Kush mountain ranges, containing  many of the highest peaks in the world and  some of the longest glaciers outside polar regions. Northern Pakistan accounts for a high level of Pakistan's tourism industry.

Geography 
The geography of Northern Pakistan is mountainous and terrain is different in each part. The Karakoram range in Gilgit Baltistan cover the border between Pakistan, India and China in the regions of Ladakh and Xinjiang. The Himalayan range in Pakistan occupies the regions of Kashmir, Kaghan, Kohistan, Deosai and Chilas. The Hindu Kush rises southwest of the Pamirs extending into Swat and Kohistan areas, separated on the east from Karakoram by the Indus River.

Snow often falls in the winter and many towns are closed such as Naran.

Flora and fauna
The regions of Khyber Pakhtunkhwa and Gilgit Baltistan include portions of two biodiversity hotspots; Mountains of Central Asia and Himalayas. Some of the wildlife species found in northern mountainous areas and Pothohar Plateau include the Bharal, Eurasian lynx, Himalayan goral, Marco Polo sheep, Marmot (in Deosai National Park) and Yellow-throated marten and birds species of Chukar partridge, Eurasian eagle-owl, Himalayan monal and Himalayan snowcock and amphibian species of Himalayan toad and Muree Hills frog. Threatened species include the Snow leopard, Himalayan brown bear, Indian wolf, Rhesus macaque, Markhor, Siberian ibex and White-bellied musk deer.

Locations 

There are three main locations of Northern Pakistan, the Chitral-Swat area, the Naran-Gilgit-Hunza-Skardu area, and the Murree-Mirpur-Muzaffarabad-Neelum area.

Western 
The western part of Northern Pakistan includes Chitral, Dir, Swat, Shangla, Kolai-Palas, Battagram, Kohistan, and Mansehra.  This includes the famous tourist attractions of Chitral, Kalash Valley, and Kalam.  Many top tourists spots are located such as Bumburet Valley, Chitral Valley, Rumbur Valley, Kalam, Bahrain, Kalash, and many others.

Central and North 
Along the Karakoram Highway are major destinations for tourists including the famous Kaghan Valley, Babusar Top, Fairy Meadows, Rakaposhi, Nanga Parbat, Attabad Lake, and Lulusar Lake.  Main cities or towns include Mansehra, Balakot, Kiwai, Naran, Kaghan, Batakundi, Jalkhad, Tatta Pani, Chilas, Gilgit, Karimabad, and Passu.  This includes a trip from Islamabad, Taxila, or Wah.  It can also be from  Peshawar and Mardan too.

East 
From Lahore or Islamabad, people sometimes go from Murree to Azad Kashmir.  Main cities of Azad Kashmir include Muzaffarabad, Mirpur, Rawalakot, and Sharda.  Banjosa Lake is a major attraction in Poonch district.  It is a man-made lake and a rest stop.  Azad Kashmir gets snow in the winter often.

Languages 

Most languages spoken in Northern Pakistan are Indo-Iranian languages, with most either belonging to the Indo-Aryan languages or Iranian languages.  The dominant languages are Urdu and Pashto and are the languages of communication in the area.  In the Hazara Division, the main language is Hindko, with minor languages including Pashto, Mankiyali, Pahari-Pothwari, and Gujari.  In Swat, the major language is Pashto, while there is Torwali, Ushojo, and Indus Kohistani.  In Waziristan, the major language is Waziri Pukhto.  In Dir, the major language is Pashto followed by Torwali and Indus Kohistani.  In Kohistan, the major language is Indus Kohistani with minorities of Khowar, Pashto, Hindko, Kohistani Shina, and Bateri.  In Chitral, there are more than 12 languages spoken with Khowar spoken the most, followed by Kalasha-mun, Dameli, Gawar-Bati, Shekhani/Kata-vari, Torwali, Kamviri, Dari, Wakhi, Kyrgyz, Yidgha, Sarikoli, Munji, Kalkoti, Shina, Waigali, Ushojo, Tajik, Uzbek, Gujari, Pashto, Turkmen, Sarikoli, Burushaski, Madaklashti, and Balti.  In the Gilgit Division and Diamer Division, the main languages are Shina, Khowar, Domaaki, Wakhi, Kyrgyz, and Sarikoli .  In the Baltistan Division, the languages are Balti, Purgi, Shina, Ladakhi, Brokskat, Burushaski, and Changthang.  The language of Azad Kashmir is Pahari-Pothwari, followed by Hindko, Gujari, Pashto, Punjabi, Dogri, Urdu, Kashmiri, Shina, and Kundal Shahi.

Notes

References 

Landforms of Khyber Pakhtunkhwa
Landforms of Gilgit-Baltistan
Landforms of Azad Kashmir
Northern Pakistan
List of Amazing Northern Areas of Pakistan